Windsor Drive is an American indie rock band.

Windsor Drive may also refer to:

 Windsor Drive (film), a 2015 American film
 Windsor Drive, in Chelsfield, London, England, UK
 Windsor Drive, in Lambs Lane, Lawshall, Suffolk, England, UK
 Windsor Drive, a portion of Virginia State Route 206, US

See also

 Royal Windsor Drive, Mississauga, Ontario, Canada
 Windsor Way (Vancouver), British Columbia, Canada
 Windsor Avenue Congregational Church, Main Street, Hartford, Connecticut, US
 Windsor Road (disambiguation)
 Windsor (disambiguation)